Lee House in Batesville, Mississippi was built in 1888.  It was listed on the National Register of Historic Places in 1984.

It was deemed significant as it is "the only Andrew Johnson residence in Batesville and is an excellent example of his ornamented L-shape cottage style."

It is a one-story ornamented cottage with a three-bay gallery with an intricate balustrade.  It has irregular massing and fenestration, and a steep roof which is emphasized by a projecting pavilion.  Paired and single brackets are used to support a cornice, and single brackets support the shallow eaves of the main roofline.

References

Houses completed in 1888
Houses on the National Register of Historic Places in Mississippi
Houses in Panola County, Mississippi
National Register of Historic Places in Panola County, Mississippi